Francisco Javier Mármol Rodríguez (born 21 July 1961), known as Catali, is a Spanish former footballer who played as a midfielder. His career is most closely associated with Albacete Balompié, with whom he played for 10 seasons, and made 53 appearances in La Liga in the early 1990s.

Career

Albacete Balompié

Catali was born in Albacete in the autonomous community of Castilla–La Mancha, and was brought up in the youth teams of local club Albacete Balompié, including spells at nearby clubs Hellín Deportivo and Villarrobledo. He was promoted to the first team during the 1983–84 season, and made his debut on New Year's Day 1984 in a 1–1 home draw with Antequerano at Estadio Carlos Belmonte. He replaced José Antonio Álvarez for the last ten minutes of the game.

He played only once more that season, also as a substitute, but the following season was to be a great one for both player and club. He made his first start in the first match of the season, a 1–0 win over Rayo Vallecano at Vallecas on 2 September, and also started at home to Linares three weeks later in another 1–0 victory. He scored his first goal on 10 October as Albacete drew 1–1 at home with Cartagena FC in the first round of the Copa del Rey to secure a 4–1 aggregate victory. He scored twice more in his 47 appearances that year, both in the Copa de la Liga, a competition which Albacete won by beating Badajoz 3–1 on aggregate in the final.

Even better for Albacete, they ended the year as runners-up in their Segunda División B group, earning promotion to the second tier.

Personal life

After retirement, Catali ran a cafeteria in Poligono Campollano in Albacete.

Honours
Albacete Balompie
Segunda División B runners-up: 1984–85 (earning promotion to Segunda División)
Segunda División B: 1989–90
Segunda División: 1990–91 Segunda División
Copa de la Liga Segunda División B: 1985

Quintanar del Rey
Segunda División Autonómica de Castilla-La Mancha: 1996–97
Primera División Autonómica de Castilla-La Mancha runners-up: 1998–99 (earning promotion to Tercera División)
Tercera División: 2000–01

Career statistics

1. Appearances in the 1985 Copa de la Liga Segunda División B
2. Appearances in the 1992–93 La Liga relegation playoff
3. Appearances in the 1993–94 Segunda División promotion playoff

References

External links

1961 births
Living people
Sportspeople from Albacete
Spanish footballers
Footballers from Castilla–La Mancha
Association football midfielders
La Liga players
Segunda División players
Segunda División B players
Tercera División players
Divisiones Regionales de Fútbol players
Albacete Balompié players
CD Toledo players